William Steele (born 19 May 1956 in Dunfermline) is a Scottish former footballer who played as a striker. Steele began his career in the early 1970s as a youngster with Rangers, although he failed to make a first-team appearance. In 1975, Steele moved to Dundee United, making ten league appearances over a year and a half in the newly formed Premier Division. After refusing to move to Dundee, as was required by then-manager Jim McLean, Steele dropped down a division to join Dumbarton. Playing in twice as many matches for the Sons, Steele moved on again at the end of the season, dropping down to the Second Division with Cowdenbeath. Steele spent five years back in his native Fife before a final two-year playing spell with Arbroath.

After leaving football, Steele moved into the bookmaker business, working in Edinburgh before opening BS Bookmakers in Inverkeithing.

References

External links
 

1956 births
Living people
Arbroath F.C. players
Cowdenbeath F.C. players
Dumbarton F.C. players
Dundee United F.C. players
Rangers F.C. players
Scottish Football League players
Scottish footballers
Footballers from Dunfermline
Association football forwards